The Zaka Valley is a valley in the Julian Alps in northwestern Slovenia.

Geography
The Zaka Valley lies at the west end of Lake Bled. The railway between Jesenice and Gorizia runs above it. Locally, a distinction is made between the Little Zaka Valley, originally at the extreme southeast part of the lake, east of Little Osojnica Hill where Jezernica Creek empties into the lake in the hamlet of Mlino, and the Big Zaka Valley, which lies at the westernmost part of the lake between Little Osojnica Hill and Kuhovnica Hill, through which Zaka Creek flows, emptying into Zaka Bay. The name Mala Zaka is now applied to the area around the rowing club at the extreme northwest part of the lake. Swimming areas are also located in the bays below the Big Zaka Valley and Little Zaka Valley.

Name
The name Zaka was first recorded in 1185 as Zake. France Bezlaj suggested that the name Zaka was a contraction of *zějaka 'opening between hills'. However, Dušan Čop has proposed that the name Zaka is a fused prepositional phrase derived from za Ak- 'behind Ak'. The name Ak refers to two parcels of land, Upper and Lower Ak, and the Ak Mansion (later renamed Partizanka). Popular etymology associated the mansion's name with the initials of its owner, Anton Kokalj (1851–1938). However, the name Ak is believed to be of Celtic origin (although there are also parallels of toponyms with Ak- from German Hacken 'hook').

History
Archaeological finds from the Urnfield culture and Roman coins have been found in the Zaka Valley, and there is a prehistoric Celtic burial site between Upper and Lower Ak. During the Second World War, members of the Carinthian People's League renovated two ski jumps in the Zaka Valley.

References

External links
 Zaka Valley at Geopedia
 Big Zaka Valley at hribi.net (photos)

Valleys in Upper Carniola
Bled
Sava basin
Valleys of the Julian Alps